Halton Barton is a farm in the parish of St Dominic in Cornwall, England.

See also

 List of farms in Cornwall

References

Farms in Cornwall